The 2016 European Athletics Championships was held in Amsterdam, Netherlands, between 6 and 10 July 2016. It was the first time the Netherlands hosted the event.

Due to 2016 being an Olympic year, there was no racewalking and the marathon competition was replaced by half marathon. The Russian team did not participate due to the suspension of the All-Russia Athletic Federation by the International Association of Athletics Federations. However, Yuliya Stepanova was individually cleared by the IAAF to compete as an independent athlete; she participated in the European championships under the flag of the European Athletic Association.

Germany and Great Britain topped the medal table with 16, with Poland won 12 medals.
Poland wins and topped the victory column with 6 gold medals (Germany & Great Britain tied with 5).

Event schedule

Results

Men

Track

Field

Women

Track

Field

Medal table

Participating nations
Athletes from a total of 50 member federations of the European Athletics Association competed at these Championships. Russia, suspended, did not participate. EAA accepted the participation of Russian-born athlete Yuliya Stepanova as an independent neutral athlete.

 Independent Athletes (EAA) (1)

 (host)

References

External links

 EAA Official website
 Official results
 EAA calendar

 
2016
International athletics competitions hosted by the Netherlands
European Athletics Championships, 2016
Athletics Championships
European Athletics Championships
European Athletics Championships
European Athletics Championships, 2016
European Athletics Championships